The 2012 Penn State Nittany Lions women's soccer team will represent Pennsylvania State University during the 2012 NCAA Division I women's soccer season and the 2012 Big Ten Conference women's soccer season. It was the program's 19th season fielding a women's varsity soccer team, and their 19th season in the Big Ten Conference. The 2012 season was Erica Dambach's 6th year at the helm. During the season the Nittany Lions lifted their 15th consecutive Big Ten regular season title with a 10-0-1 record. The squad played in their first NCAA National Championship against North Carolina at Torero Stadium, losing 4–1. Erica Dambach was awarded with Coach of the Year from United Soccer Coaches and Soccer America; Maya Hayes and Christine Nairn were named first team All-Americans.

Background 
Penn State head coach Erica Dambach, who also served as an assistant coach to the United States Women's National team, won Gold in the 2012 Olympics before returning for the start of the season. In one of the opening matches of the 2012 season, hosting defending national champion No. 1 Stanford, Penn State set a Jeffrey Field attendance record seeing 5,117 fans in the crowd. Maya Hayes and Taylor Schram returned to the team in late September after winning the 2012 U-20 Women's World Cup with the United States. Finishing the Big Ten regular season 10-0-1 the Nittany Lions lifted their 15th consecutive Big Ten regular season title. Receiving the No. 1 bid in the Big Ten tournament the team would eventually fall in the semifinals to Illinois. Penn State received an at-large, 1st seed bid to the 2012 NCAA Tournament, opening the competition by defeating Long Island University Brooklyn. On the way to the finals, Penn State would face and defeat Boston College, Michigan, Duke and Florida State. Penn State played in their first NCAA National Championship against North Carolina at Torero Stadium. Tied 1–1 at half North Carolina went on to score three unanswered seeing the Nittany Lions fall 4–1. The Nittany Lions received 5 of 6 possible individual awards from the Big Ten: Maya Hayes named Forward of the Year, Erica Dambach named Coach of the Year, Christine Nairn named Midfielder of the Year, Whit Church named Defensive Player of the Year and Raquel Rodriguez named Freshman of the Year. Nationally, Erica Dambach was awarded with Coach of the Year from United Soccer Coaches and Soccer America; Maya Hayes and Christine Nairn were also named first team All-Americans.

Squad

Roster

Schedule 

|-
!colspan=8 style=""| 
Pre-season
|-

|-
!colspan=8 style=""| Regular season
|-

|-
!colspan=8 style=""| Big Ten Tournament
|-

|-
!colspan=8 style=""| NCAA Tournament
|-

Source:Penn State Athletics

References

External links 

 PSU Soccer Schedule

Penn State Nittany Lions women's soccer
Penn State Nittany Lions